Israel entered the Eurovision Song Contest 1992 with the song "Ze Rak Sport" by Dafna Dekel after she won the Israeli national final.

Before Eurovision

Kdam Eurovision 1992 
This Israeli broadcaster, IBA, held a national final to select the Israeli entry for the Eurovision Song Contest 1992, held in Malmö, Sweden. The contest was held at the IBA TV Studios in Jerusalem, hosted by Ronnie Yoval and Noam Aviram. 12 songs competed, with the winner being decided through the votes of 7 regional juries.

The winner was Dafna Dekel with the song "Ze Rak Sport", composed by Kobi Oshrat and Ehud Manor.

Spokespersons
Ma'ale Adumim - 
IDF - 
Ramat Gan - Alon Ben David
Kiryat Malakhi - 
Jerusalem - Amir Chay
Kfar Ruppin - Amnon Peer 
Tel-Aviv - Dani Lewinstein

At Eurovision
Dekel performed 3rd on the night of the final, following Belgium and preceding Turkey. She received 85 points, placing 6th in a field of 23. Israel was one of the two countries that didn't award points to the eventual winner Ireland. (the other being France)

Voting

References

External links 
 Israeli National Final 1992

1992
Countries in the Eurovision Song Contest 1992
Eurovision